My Aunt from Honfleur (French: Ma tante d'Honfleur) is a 1949 French comedy film directed by René Jayet and starring Suzanne Dehelly, Jean Parédès and Paulette Dubost. It is based on the 1914 play My Aunt from Honfleur by Paul Gavault.

Cast
 Suzanne Dehelly as Mme Raymond, la tante d'Honfleur
 Jean Parédès as Adolphe		
 Roger Nicolas as Charles
 Jeanne Fusier-Gir as Mme Dorlange
 Dorette Ardenne as Yvonne
 Paulette Dubost as Lucette
 Raymond Cordy as Clément
 Roger Bontemps as Le fêtard
 Léo Campion 
 Mona Goya
 Charles Dechamps as M. Dorlange
 Colette Georges	
 Jacques Grello		
 René Marc as Un gendarme
 Léon Pauléon as Livarot
 Robert Rocca as Le maître d'hôtel
 Émile Ronet as Le brigadier
 Nicole Rozan 
 Georges Sauval as 	Le gardien de la tour

References

Bibliography 
 Goble, Alan. The Complete Index to Literary Sources in Film. Walter de Gruyter, 1999.

External links 
 

1949 films
French comedy films
1949 comedy films
1940s French-language films
Films directed by René Jayet
French films based on plays
Remakes of French films
1940s French films